William Adam Piper (May 21, 1826, Pennsylvania – August 5, 1899, San Francisco) was an American politician and a businessperson. He was a one-term member of the United States House of Representatives from California from 1875 to 1877.

Biography 
William Adam Piper was born on May 21, 1826, in Franklin County, Pennsylvania. He attended the common schools and later moved to St. Louis, Missouri. During the Mexican–American War, he served in Company A, Eighth Missouri Light Artillery, from June 8, 1846, to June 24, 1847. He moved to California in 1848 and settled in San Francisco in 1849, where he engaged in mercantile pursuits.

William Adam Piper was elected as a Democrat to the 44th United States Congress. He received only 49.06% of the vote, the opposition being divided between Iva P. Rankin running as a Republican and the independent candidate John F. Swift.  Piper served from March 4, 1875, until March 3, 1877. In 1876, he was an unsuccessful candidate for re-election to the 45th United States Congress. He continued his business activities, and he died on August 5, 1899, in San Francisco, California.

He was interred in Odd Fellows Cemetery in San Francisco, California and re-interred at Greenlawn Memorial Park in Colma, California.

References

Democratic Party members of the United States House of Representatives from California
1826 births
1899 deaths
19th-century American politicians
Burials at Odd Fellows Cemetery (San Francisco, California)